The following are International rankings of France.

Cities
gaWC Inventory of World Cities, 1999: :Paris alpha world city

Economic
 The Wall Street Journal and the Heritage Foundation: Index of Economic Freedom 2007, ranked 45 out of 157 countries
International Monetary Fund: GDP (nominal) per capita 2006,  out of 182 countries
International Monetary Fund: GDP (nominal) 2006, ranked 5 out of 181 countries
List of countries by GDP - official exchange rate 2019, ranked 8, out of 226 countries
World Economic Forum: Global Competitiveness Index 2006–2007, ranked 18 out of 125 countries
World Bank: Ease of Doing Business Index, ranked 31 out of 178 countries
World Tourism Organization: World Tourism rankings 2008, ranked 1 in tourist arrivals
Fortune Global 500 2010, with 39 worldwide corporations, France has the third largest number of wealthiest corporations out of 32 countries

Environmental
Yale University: Environmental Sustainability Index 2005, ranked 36 out of 146 countries
New Economics Foundation: Happy Planet Index 2006, ranked 129 out of 178 countries

Globalization
KOF: Globalization Index 2007, ranked 6 out of 122 countries
 A.T. Kearney/Foreign Policy Magazine: Globalization Index 2006, ranked 23 out of 62 countries

Military
 Ranked 5th by military expenditures out of 170 countries.
 CSIS: active troops, ranked 21st out of 166 countries

Political
 Transparency International: Corruption Perceptions Index 2007, ranked 19 out of 179 countries
Reporters Without Borders: Worldwide press freedom index 2007, ranked 31 out of 169 countries
Economist Intelligence Unit: Democracy Index 2007, ranked 24 out of 167 countries
Fund for Peace and Foreign Policy magazine: Failed States Index 2007, ranked 157 out of 177 countries

Social
Economist Intelligence Unit: Quality-of-life index 2005, ranked 25 out of 108 countries
 UN: Human Development Index 2007, ranked 8 out of 177 countries
Population ranked 19 out of 221 countries

Technological
Economist Intelligence Unit e-readiness rankings 2007, ranked 22 out of 69 countries
The World Factbook: number of Internet users, ranked 10 out of 80 countries

International rankings

See also

Lists of countries
Lists by country
List of international rankings

References

France